Baijnath refers to the following places in India:

 Baijnath, Himachal Pradesh
 Baijnath Temple
 Baijnath, Uttarakhand
 Baijnath, Kaimur